Gival Press is an American literary publishing house specializing in non-fiction, short stories, literary fiction and poetry. The privately held, independent company was founded in 1998 in Arlington, Virginia. It publishes books and anthologies in English, French and Spanish and sponsors four contests for fiction. Several winners of Gival Press Short Story Awards went on to win prestigious literary honors such as the Pushcart prize, O. Henry Awards, PEN/Faulkner awards, New York Times Bestseller listees, Frank O'Connor International Short Story Award, Midland Authors Award and Iowa Author Awards.

Arlington Literary Journal
Since 2005, Gival Press has published the online literary journal Arlington Literary Journal also known as ArLiJo. The editor-in-chief is Robert L. Giron. There have been guest editors, including Katherine E. Young, Hollynd Karapetkova, Teri Ellen Cross Davis, and past associate editor, Sarah Fannon,

Literary awards
Gival Press offers several literary awards, including the Gival Press Novel Award in odd ending years, the Oscar Wilde Award annually, the Gival Press Poetry Award in even ending years and the Gival Press Short Story Award annually. All contests strictly adhere to the Council of Literary Magazines & Presses Contests Contest Code of Ethics.

Novel Award
The winner of the Gival Press Novel Award receives a cash prize in addition to publication of the winning novel. Past judges include Donald Berger, Tim W. Brown, John Domini, Richard Peabody, Kim Roberts, Thad Rutkowski, Seth Brady Tucker, and Elizabeth Harris.
 2005 – Kiki Denis, The Last Day of Paradise
 2006 – Barbara de la Cuesta, [working title: Ordóñez] The Spanish Teacher
 2007 – Elizabeth Oness, Twelve Rivers of the Body
 2008 – Lowell Mick White, That Demon Life
 2009 – David Winner, The Cannibal of Guadalajara
 2010 – Peter Leach, Gone by Sundown
 2011 – Perry Glasser, Riverton Noir
 2012 – Mark Brazaitis, Julia & Rodrigo
 2013 – Thomas H. McNeely, Ghost Horse
 2014 – Elizabeth Harris, Mayhem: Three Lives of a Woman
 2015 – Robert Schirmer, Barrow's Point
 2016 – Tyler McMahon, Dream of Another America
 2018 – William Orem, Miss Lucy
 2020 – Jordan Silversmith, Redshift, Blueshift
 2022 - Khanh Ha, Her: The Flame Tree

Oscar Wilde Award
Named after the Irish poet and playwright Oscar Wilde, the Gival Press Oscar Wilde Award is one of the oldest prizes recognizing LGBT poetry. It is awarded annually for the "best previously unpublished original poem written in English which best relates GLBT life".
 2002 – Jeff Walt, "To My Ex-lover Making a Commitment"
 2003 – Ron Mohring, "Birds of Paradise"
 2004 – Jeff Walt, "Lying in Bed"
 2005 – Julie Marie Wade, "The Lunar Plexus"
 2006 – Dante Micheaux, "Bread Boy"
 2007 – Pablo Miguel Martínez, "At the Pentecostal Baths"
 2008 – Stephen S. Mills, "Iranian Boys Hanged for Sodomy, July 2005"
 2009 – Chino Mayrina, "We Must Always Sing"
 2010 – Sarah Machinak, "L.B.A."
 2011 – Rob A. Jacques, "Wonders of the Invisible World"
 2012 – Henry Hughes, "Action"
 2013 – Michael Montlack, "Questions My Father Asked Watching This Old House (1993)"
 2014 – Gina R. Evers, "The Body Beautiful"
 2015 – Mike Zimmerman, "Summer Rainstorm"
 2016 – Kevin McLellan, "Anonymity"
 2017 – Dan Vera, "Lingering Fraction"
 2018 – Kailee Pedersen, "Achilles and Patroclus in New York City, 1983"
 2019 – Michael Rodman, "Document (Undocumented)"
 2020 – George Klawitter, "Twenty"
 2021 - Brian Cronwall, "In the Blackish Place Where We Come to Love"
 2022 - Brad Fairchild, "Vowelish Palares"

Poetry Award
Formerly a chapbook prize, the Gival Press Poetry Prize honors a poetry manuscript. Recipients receive a cash prize and publication of the winning manuscript.
 1999 – Jeff Mann, Flint Shards from Sussex 2000 – Gerard Wozek, Dervish 2001 – George Klawitter, Let Orpheus Take Your Hand 2002 – Janet I. Buck, Tickets to a Closing Play 2003 – Beverly Burch, Sweet to Burn 2004 – Paula Goldman, The Great Canopy 2005 – Donna J. Gelagotis Lee, On the Altar of Greece 2006 – Barbara Louise Ungar, The Origin of the Milky Way 2007 – Richard Carr, Honey 2008 – Rich Murphy, Voyeur 2009 – Cecilia Mart—nez-Gil, Psaltery and Serpentines 2010 – Clifford Bernier, The Silent Art 2011 – Yvette Neisser Moreno, Grip 2012 – Lisa Graley, Box of Blue Horses 2013 – Seth Brady Tucker, We Deserve the Gods We Ask For 2014 – Eric Nelson, Some Wonder 2015 – Linwood D. Rumney, Abandoned Earth 2016 – C. M. Mayo, Meteor 2019 – Matthew Pennock, The Miracle Machine 2021 - Kate Monaghan, "Disputed Site: poems"

Short Story Award
The Gival Press Short Story Award honors a previously unpublished original (non-translated) short story in English.
 2004 – Iqbal Pittalwala, "Legacy"
 2005 – Tim Mullaney, "On the Verge"
 2006 – Marie Holmes, "Harvest Cycle"
 2007 – Mark Wisniewski, "Better Terms"
 2008 – Tim Johnston, "Water"
 2009 – Perry Glasser, "I-95, Southbound"
 2010 – Daniel Degnan, "Fat Tails"
 2011 – Kristin FitzPatrick, "The Music She Will Never Hear"
 2012 – Karenmary Penn, "Void"
 2013 – Lynn Stegner, "For All the Obvious Reasons"
 2014 – Steven J. Cahill, "Progressive Linkage"
 2015 – Julyan Peard, "The Constellation of Scorpio"
 2016 – Elaine Ray, "Pidgin"
 2017 – Rochelle Distelheim, "More Cousin's club than Country"
 2018 – Joan G. Gurfield, "The Resistance"
 2019 – A.J. Rodriguez, "Efímera"
 2020 – Vikram Ramakrishnan, "Jackson Heights"
 2021 - Leah Eichler, "My Pompeii"
 2022 - Aaron Tillman, "Kennebunk Correction"

Award-winning books
Gival Press books have been the recipients of a number of literary awards.
 2001 – Dreams and Other Ailments by Teresa Bevin – ForeWord Magazine Book of the Year Award for Fiction
 2003 – The Smoke Week by Ellis Avery – 2003 Walter Rumsey Marvin Award
 2004 – Sweet to Burn by Beverly Burch – Lambda Literary Award for Lesbian Poetry
 2005 – An Interdisciplinary Introduction to Women's Studies – DIY Book Festival Award for Compilations/Anthologies
 2007 – The Origin of the Milky Way by Barbara Louise Ungar – Adirondack Literary Award, Best Book of Poetry 
 2008 – Lockjaw: Collected Appalachian Stories by Holly Farris – Appalachian Writers Association Book of the Year Award
 2009 – Poetic Voices Without Borders 2 edited by Robert L. Giron – National Best Book Award for Fiction & Literature: Anthologies
 2009 – Voyeur by Rich Murphy – Los Angeles Book Festival Award, Poetry
 2010 – Second Acts by Tim W. Brown – London Book Festival Award, General Fiction
 2010 – Voyeur by Rich Murphy – da Vinci Eye Award for Superior Cover Artwork

References

External links
 
  for Arlington Literary Journal''

1998 establishments in Virginia
Book publishing companies based in Virginia
Literary publishing companies
Publishing companies established in 1998
Small press publishing companies